Xavier Malisse and Dick Norman were the defending champions, but Norman chose not to participate, and only Malisse competed that year.
Malisse competed with Gilles Müller, but lost in the first round to Igor Kunitsyn and Jim Thomas.

Sanchai Ratiwatana and Sonchat Ratiwatana won in the final 6–4, 7–5, against Marcos Baghdatis and Marc Gicquel.

Seeds

Draw

Draw

External links
 Draw

Doubles
Maharashtra Open